Bram van der Vlugt (28 May 1934 – 19 December 2020) was a Dutch actor. He is known for playing the role of Sinterklaas for over two decades. He died on 19 December 2020, at the age of 86, after contracting COVID-19 during the COVID-19 pandemic in the Netherlands.

Career

Sinterklaas 
He is known for playing the role of Sinterklaas between 1986 and 2010, most notably the annual arrival of Sinterklaas in the Netherlands as well as in the television series De Club van Sinterklaas. He also made many appearances as Sinterklaas in many other television shows, such as Goede tijden, slechte tijden (2006), Life & Cooking (2004 and 2006), De Wereld Draait Door (2008 and 2010), MaDiWoDoVrijdagShow (2010) and Sint & De Leeuw (2005 – 2011, 2018). As of 2011, Stefan de Walle is his successor to play the role of Sinterklaas. Van der Vlugt did appear as Sinterklaas on several occasions after that, most notably in the 2019 film De Brief voor Sinterklaas and the 2020 film De Grote Sinterklaasfilm, which premiered two months before his death. The film became the tenth highest-grossing Dutch film of 2020. Both films were directed by Lucio Messercola. In the 2021 film De Grote Sinterklaasfilm: Trammelant in Spanje, also directed by Messercola, the role of Sinterklaas is played by Robert ten Brink.

Television 
Between 1963 and 1965 he played the role of Dr. Finlay in Memorandum van een dokter.

Between 2005 and 2008 he played the role of attorney Marius de Boer in the television series Keyzer & De Boer Advocaten. Between 2013 and 2014 he played the role of Onno Kremer in the television series Moordvrouw.

Personal life 
Van der Vlugt was born in The Hague, Netherlands, the son of Ellen (Stokvis) and Abraham Rutger van der Vlugt. His mother was Jewish, and was killed in the Holocaust.

Van der Vlugt was the father of musician and former model Marijne van der Vlugt.

Filmography

Film 
1976: Alle dagen feest – Chef–redacteur
1978: Pastorale 1943 – van Dale
1981: Het verboden bacchanaal – Frits van der Laan
1982: A Question of Silence – Psychiater
1982: De smaak van water – Hospital Director
1982: Knokken voor twee – Vader Saskia en Joris
1985: Tracks in the Snow – Hein van Oyen
1992: Flodders in America – Nederlandse ambassadeur
1995: Filmpje! – Dokter Lozig
1997: Tropic of Emerald – Herman
2001: Family – Jan
2002: Peter Bell – Sinterklaas
2003: Kees de jongen – Heer 1 Schoolprijs
2009: Anubis en de wraak van Arghus – Manus
2011: Bennie Stout – Sinterklaas
2014: Oorlogsgeheimen – Viccar
2014: Pak Van Mijn Hart – Niek sr.
2017: Het Verlangen – Alfred Goudemondt
2019: De Brief voor Sinterklaas – Sinterklaas
2020: Rundfunk: Jachterwachter – Nestor
2020: De Grote Sinterklaasfilm – Sint Nicolaas

Television 
1963–1965: Memorandum van een dokter – Dokter Alan Finlay
1975: Klaverweide – van Amerongen
1979: Pommetje Horlepiep – Langpoot
1983–1984: Herenstraat 10 – Gerard van Laar
1991–1994: Medisch Centrum West – Victor Brouwer
1999–2009: De Club van Sinterklaas – Sinterklaas
2005–2008: Keyzer & De Boer Advocaten – Atty. Marius de Boer
2013–2014: Moordvrouw – Onno Kremer
2015: Rundfunk – Bernard
2016–2018: Dokter Deen – Bart Vos

References

External links 

 

1934 births
2020 deaths
20th-century Dutch male actors
21st-century Dutch male actors
Dutch male film actors
Dutch male television actors
Male actors from The Hague
Deaths from the COVID-19 pandemic in the Netherlands